Wilfred Rowland Childe (1890–1952) was a British author and poet.

Childe was educated at Harrow School and Magdalen College, Oxford. He edited Oxford Poetry in 1916 and 1917. 

In 1922, Childe became an Assistant Lecturer in English literature at the University of Leeds, being promoted to Lecturer in 1931.

He became a Roman Catholic convert in 1916. He is chiefly remembered for Dream English. A Fantastical Romance (1917) which was and still is something of a minor cult book. He was admired by Arthur Machen and later by the poet Robin Skelton.  His Selected Poems was published in 1936. He associated with the Sitwells, but was no modernist.

Works
The Little City (1911)
Dream English. A Fantastical Romance (1917)
The Gothic Rose (1922)
Ivory Palaces (1925)
Blue Distance (1930) travel writing
The Golden Thurible
The Garland of Armor
Selected Poems (1936)
"The Happy Garden" (1945)The Blessèd Pastures'' (1950)

Notes

External links
 
 Archival material at 

1890 births
1952 deaths
People educated at Harrow School
Alumni of Magdalen College, Oxford
British male poets
20th-century British poets
20th-century British male writers